Carl Bernard Pomerance (born 1944 in Joplin, Missouri) is an American number theorist.  He attended college at Brown University and later received his Ph.D. from Harvard University in 1972 with a dissertation proving that any odd perfect number has at least seven distinct prime factors. He joined the faculty at the University of Georgia, becoming full professor in 1982. He subsequently worked at Lucent Technologies for a number of years, and then became a distinguished Professor at Dartmouth College.

Contributions
He has over 120 publications, including co-authorship with Richard Crandall of Prime numbers: a computational perspective (Springer-Verlag, first edition 2001, second edition 2005), and with Paul Erdős. He is the inventor of one of the integer factorization methods, the quadratic sieve algorithm, which was used in 1994 for the factorization of RSA-129. He is also one of the discoverers of the Adleman–Pomerance–Rumely primality test.

Awards and honors
He has won many teaching and research awards, including the Chauvenet Prize in 1985, MAA's Deborah and Franklin Haimo Distinguished Teaching Award in 1997, and the Levi L. Conant Prize in 2001 for "A Tale of Two Sieves".

In 2012 he became a fellow of the American Mathematical Society. He also became the John G. Kemeny Parents Professor of Mathematics in the same year.

See also 
Carmichael numbers
Ruth–Aaron pair

References

External links 

 Home page
 2001 Conant Prize, an article in the Bulletin of the AMS, vol 48:4 (2001), 418–419.

1944 births
20th-century American mathematicians
21st-century American mathematicians
Living people
Number theorists
20th-century American Jews
Brown University alumni
Harvard University alumni
Dartmouth College faculty
University of Georgia faculty
Fellows of the American Mathematical Society
Mathematicians from Missouri
21st-century American Jews